

Acts of the National Assembly for Wales

|-
| {{|Local Government Byelaws (Wales) Act 2012|cyshort=Deddf Is-ddeddfau Llywodraeth Leol (Cymru) 2012|anaw|2|29-11-2012|maintained=y|url=deddf-is-ddeddfau-llywodraeth-leol-cymru-local-government-byelaws-wales-act|An Act of the National Assembly for Wales to make provision for the powers of county councils, county borough councils, community councils and other public bodies to make byelaws; the procedure for making byelaws; the enforcement of byelaws; and for connected purposes.|cylong=Deddf gan Gynulliad Cenedlaethol Cymru i wneud darpariaeth ar gyfer pwerau cynghorau sir, cynghorau bwrdeistref sirol, cynghorau cymuned a chyrff cyhoeddus eraill i wneud is-ddeddfau; y weithdrefn ar gyfer gwneud is-ddeddfau; gorfodi is-ddeddfau; ac at ddibenion cysylltiedig.}}
}}

References

2012